The Nosematidae are a family of microsporidians from

Genera
As accepted by Species Fungorum;
Caudospora - 2 spp.

Issia

Vairimorpha

References 

Microsporidia
Fungus families